Eduardo Jorge Anzorena is a pioneer in collaborative search for humane and practical solutions to the housing crisis among Asia's urban poor.

References

Argentine academics
Academic staff of Sophia University
Living people
Year of birth missing (living people)
Place of birth missing (living people)